John Loughran may refer to:

 John Loughran (American football), American football player and coach
 John T. Loughran, American judge in New York

See also
John Loughrin (1852–1917), Ontario merchant and political figure